Alexey Vatutin was the defending champion but lost in the quarterfinals to Hubert Hurkacz.

Hurkacz won the title after defeating Taro Daniel 6–1, 6–1 in the final.

Seeds

Draw

Finals

Top half

Bottom half

External Links
Main Draw
Qualifying Draw

Poznań Open - Singles
2018 Singles